Serena Eddy-Moulton (born May 20, 1964) is an American rower. She competed in the women's quadruple sculls event at the 1992 Summer Olympics.  She graduated from Harvard University.

References

External links
 

1964 births
Living people
American female rowers
Olympic rowers of the United States
Rowers at the 1992 Summer Olympics
Sportspeople from Burlington, Vermont
Harvard Crimson women's rowers
21st-century American women